The Atlantic Reporter is a United States regional case law reporter.  It is part of the National Reporter System created by John B. West for West Publishing Company, which is now part of Thomson West.

The Atlantic Reporter contains select opinions of state supreme courts and lower appellate courts from the following jurisdictions:

 Connecticut
 Delaware
 District of Columbia
 Maine
 Maryland
 New Hampshire
 New Jersey
 Pennsylvania
 Rhode Island
 Vermont

The first series of the Atlantic Reporter was published from 1895 until 1938, for 200 volumes. The Atlantic Reporter, Second Series, was published from 1939 until 2010, for 999 volumes. The Atlantic Reporter, Third Series, is published from 2010 to the present. The citation forms for these series are A., A.2d, and A.3d respectively.

References

External links
Official West Publishing site for the Atlantic Reporter, 2d

National Reporter System